Eisenstein is a 2000 Canadian film about Sergei Eisenstein, directed by Renny Bartlett and starring Simon McBurney, Raymond Coulthard and Jacqueline McKenzie.

Accolades
It was nominated for five Genie Awards including Best Picture, Best Director, and Best Screenplay.

Reception
New York Times reviewer Stephen Holden wrote that the film was "a series of loosely connected (and unevenly acted) theatrical sketches whose central theme is the director's shifting relationship with the Soviet government", and that "as dazzingly played" by McBurney, the title character "bears resemblances to everyone from the punk rocker Johnny Rotten to the contemporary director Peter Sellars." The Independent called it "engagingly irreverent take on an important, tragic story".  John Petrakis of the Chicago Tribune commented that director Bartlett seemed "less interested in Eisenstein the filmmaker than he is in Eisenstein the political animal, gay man, Jewish target and artistic rebel", and described the overall result as "a clever pseudo-bio that manages to have a good time as it doles out pieces of the famous director's life". Ed Gonzales of Slant Magazine gave the film a less favorable review, calling it "efficient and concise but . . . lifeless".

References

External links

2000 films
Canadian drama films
English-language Canadian films
Cultural depictions of film directors
Biographical films about film directors and producers
2000s English-language films
2000s Canadian films